The Muthanna governorate election of 2013 was held on 20 April 2013 alongside elections for all other governorates outside Iraqi Kurdistan, Kirkuk, Anbar, and Nineveh.

Results 

|- style="background-color:#E9E9E9"
!align="left" colspan=2 valign=top|Party/Coalition!! Allied national parties !! Leader !!Seats !! Change !!Votes
|-
|bgcolor="#FF0000"|
|align=left|State of Law Coalition || align=left|Islamic Dawa PartyIslamic Dawa Party – Iraq OrganisationBadr OrganizationIslamic Virtue PartyNational Reform TrendIndependent Bloc ||Nouri Al-Maliki|| 9 || 3 || 76,777
|-
|bgcolor="#009933"|
|align=left|Citizens Alliance ||align=left|ISCI|| Abdul Aziz al-Hakim|| 7 || 2 || 67,203
|-
|bgcolor="#000000"|
|align=left|Liberal Coalition|| align=left|Sadrist Movement || || 3 || 1 || 31,290
|-
|
|align=left|Independent Iraqi Qualifications Gathering || || || 3 || || 27,065
|-
|
|align=left|Gathering for Al Muthana || || || 2 || || 24,931
|-
|
|align=left|Al Muthanna Alliance for Change & Reconstruction|| align=left|Iraqi Communist PartyDemocratic MovementNDP|| Ghazi Mussa Kathem Abdul Hussein || 2 || || 17,561
|-
|bgcolor="#098DCD"|
|align=left|Al Iraqia National and United Coalition||align=left| || || || || 4,375
|-
|bgcolor="#F6BE22"|
|align=left|Iraq’s Benevolence and Generosity List || align=left| || || || || 904
|-
|
|align=left|Sons of the City Bloc || || || || || 441
|-
|bgcolor="#00009F"|
|align=left|Iraqi Front for National Dialogue || || || || || 309
|-
|colspan=2 align=left|Total || || || 26 || - || 250,856
|-
|colspan=7 align=left|

References

Sources
 Musings on Iraq
 ISW
 IHEC Muthanna Results
 List of political coalition approved for election in provincial councils - IHEC 
 al-Sumaria - Muthanna Coalitions

2013 Iraqi governorate elections